Untold Passion is the debut album by Schon & Hammer.  Hammer, a founding member of the Mahavishnu Orchestra, is best known for his soundtrack work on Miami Vice. Schon is the guitarist for the band Journey.

Track listing 
"Wasting Time" (Schon, Hodgkinson) 3:46
"I'm Talking to You" (Schon, Hodgkinson, Hammer) 4:54
"The Ride" (Hammer) 4:41 (instrumental)
"I'm Down" (Schon, Hodgkinson) 4:08
"Arc" (Hammer) 3:58 (instrumental)
"It's Alright" (Schon, R. Silver, Hodgkinson) 4:43
"Hooked on Love" (Hodgkinson, Hammer) 3:06
"On the Beach" (Schon) 5:29 (instrumental)
"Untold Passion" (Hammer) 7:02 (instrumental)
(Bonus track in 2013 reissue) "Planet Empathy" 4:26 (instrumental)

Personnel 
Neal Schon - guitars, synth guitar, vocals
Colin Hodgkinson - bass guitar
Jan Hammer - drums, keyboards, synthesizers

Production 
Produced By Neal Schon & Jan Hammer
Engineered By Jan Hammer

References 

1981 debut albums
Schon & Hammer albums
Columbia Records albums